Osnovianskyi District is an urban district of the city of Kharkiv, Ukraine, named after a neighborhood in the city Osnova.

The district was established in January 1919 as Petynsko-Zhuravlivskyi. In September 1924, it was renamed Chervonozavodskyi. In 2016, it was renamed to its current name to comply with decommunization laws.

References

Urban districts of Kharkiv